Drexelbrook station is a SEPTA Route 101 trolley stop in Drexel Hill, Pennsylvania. It is officially located near Stanbridge Road and Woodland Avenue in the Drexelbrook area, however the actual grade crossing and platforms are on Wildell Road south of Woodland Avenue and north of Revere Road and Drexelbrook Drive.

Trolleys arriving at this station travel between 69th Street Terminal in Upper Darby, Pennsylvania and Orange Street in Media, Pennsylvania. The station has a shed with a roof where people can go inside when it is raining on one platform and a bench on the other.  No parking is available at this station.

Station layout

External links

SEPTA Media–Sharon Hill Line stations